World Neurosurgery is a monthly peer-reviewed medical journal that was established in 1973 as Surgical Neurology before obtaining its current name in 2010. It is published by Elsevier and is the official journal of the World Federation of Neurosurgical Societies. The editor-in-chief is Edward C. Benzel (Department of Neurosurgery, Cleveland Clinic).

Editors-in-chief 
Editors-in-chief have included:
 Paul Bucy (Wake Forest University School of Medicine) and Robert J. White (Case Western Reserve University), 1973-1985
 Eben Alexander Jr (Bowman Gray School of Medicine), 1986-1993
 James I. Ausman (University of Illinois at Chicago and University of California, Los Angeles), 1994-2009
 Michael L.J. Apuzzo (Keck School of Medicine of USC), 2010–2015
 Edward C. Benzel (Department of Neurosurgery, Cleveland Clinic, January, 2015–present

Abstracting and indexing 
The journal is abstracted and indexed in:
 
According to the Journal Citation Reports, the journal has a 2020 impact factor of 2.104.

References 

English-language journals
Elsevier academic journals
Publications established in 1973
Monthly journals
Neurosurgery journals